Stompa is a fictional extraterrestrial supervillainess and goddess appearing in books published by DC Comics. Created by writer/artist Jack Kirby, the character first appeared in Mister Miracle #6 (January 1972).

Publication history
Stompa first appeared in Mister Miracle #6 (January 1972) and was created by Jack Kirby.

Fictional character biography
Stompa was one of the most promising youths in Granny Goodness' orphanage. Because of her strength and ruthless nature, Stompa was trained to become one of the founding members of the Female Furies. Proving her loyalty to Granny Goodness, she quickly turned on the former leader of the Furies, Big Barda, and attacked her on Earth. When Big Barda returned to Apokolips, however, Stompa joined her in the infiltration of Section Zero, much to Granny's dismay. Taking refuge on Earth, Stompa and the other Furies aided Mister Miracle in several missions and his work as a stunt performer. Later, they returned to Apokolips and were punished for their betrayal.

The Female Furies were later sent on a mission to retrieve Glorious Godfrey from Earth, and Stompa came into conflict with the Suicide Squad. She battled Bronze Tiger, who was unable to hurt her. The Furies were then able to grab Godfrey and leave, but not without Bernadeth betraying Lashina and leaving her for dead on Earth. Stompa was indifferent to the situation between the two Furies, but when Lashina brought the Suicide Squad to Apokolips, Stompa allied with her fellow New Gods. In the ensuing battle, Stompa was defeated by Big Barda. She later resurfaced with the other Furies when they were sent to capture Mister Miracle. 

Their adversary had ended up back on Apokolips while marketing soap that inadvertently caused peaceful feelings. They were successful in their mission, but during the battle, Stompa knocked free the cargo hold encasing the "cleansing soap". The Furies, confused by the soap, were then scolded by Darkseid and later punished. Mister Miracle is allowed to escape.

Stompa has also battled Superman on several occasions, as well as his counterparts Superboy and Supergirl, Young Justice, and Martian Manhunter. During a skirmish with Batman and Superman on Paradise Island. Stompa and the Furies killed Harbinger. Later, during a battle between the Furies and Big Barda and Wonder Woman, Stompa was stabbed by Barda's lance. It was assumed she had not survived, but she recuperated and returned to serve alongside the Furies. She appeared with the other Female Furies as they battled Firestorm and Orion.

In Final Crisis Stompa was one of the Furies whose spirit possessed the body of one of Earth's heroes or villains. Her vessel was Giganta, although she was called Gigantrix by her comrades. She wore the familiar skull-and-crossbones mask of her New Gods incarnation, and was defeated by Supergirl.

The New 52 
After Darkseid had been enslaved by his daughter Grail, Stompa and the other Female Furies accepted an offer from Big Barda to help defeat Grail as well as to protect Barda's husband, Mister Miracle. Stompa participated in the final battle against Grail and Darkseid, which resulted in the pair's defeat. Stompa then left for Apokolips with the rest of the Furies, including Barda.

DC Rebirth
After Lex Luthor claimed leadership of Apokolips, Stompa joined Granny Goodness and the other Female Furies in the deadlands, awaiting Darkseid's return. She later participated in the battle against Kalibak's forces, though she was eventually defeated by her teammate Lois Lane after the Furies turned on the human when she revealed her relationship with Superman. Stompa was imprisoned on Apokolips with Lashina, Mad Harriet, and Granny Goodness when Superman became ruler of the planet.

At some point later, Stompa and her comrades were freed from their imprisonment by Darkseid, who had been slowly regaining his power on Earth. Along with the other Female Furies, Stompa was assigned to seek out mystical artifacts that would further empower Darkseid. Unbeknownst to Darkseid, Giganta had revealed to Steve Trevor the location of the remaining relics. As the Furies traveled to a museum in Turkey, they were ambushed by Trevor and his strike force, the Oddfellows. Stompa escaped alongside Bernadeth and Gilotina, reporting their failure back to Darkseid.

Much later, Stompa attended the birth of Jacob, Mister Miracle and Big Barda's son, alongside the other Furies, but the whole scenario was just an illusion that Mister Miracle had while trapped in the Omega Sanction.

Powers and abilities
Stompa is a massive woman and the most powerful member of the Female Furies. Her powers are based on the use of super strength, resistance and a high level of invulnerability. Stompa is strong enough to lift more than 70 tons and can jump great distances. In addition, Stompa is a formidable warrior, in combat uses anti-matter boots that enhance the incredible strength of her legs. She uses her anti-matter boots to crush her victims, and can create earthquakes or tremors by stomping onto the ground.

Other versions

Amalgam
In the Marvel/DC amalgam series Unlimited Access, Stompa merges with the Blob and becomes a female villain known as Blobba.

Ame-Comi Girls
Stompa is a member of Big Barda's space pirates.

Sensation Comics Featuring Wonder Woman
Stompa appears in the story "Dig For Fire" in the anthology series Sensation Comics Featuring Wonder Woman. After discovering that Wonder Woman had traveled to Apokolips to save two of her amazon sisters, Stompa along with Lashina and Mad Harriet tracked her down. The Furies refused to speak peacefully to Wonder Woman, and in the ensuing battle, the heroine was shot in the neck by an explosive dart from Bernadeth. Stompa threw Wonder Woman's body into the fiery pits. When the Furies reported back to Darkseid, he was displeased that they had killed her rather than executing her publicly. Wonder Woman, still alive, managed to save her sisters. The Furies once again battled the amazon, though the battle ended when Darkseid killed the two amazons and allowed Wonder Woman to return to Earth.

Scooby-Doo! Team-Up
Stompa appears in Scooby-Doo! Team-Up featuring a crossover with the Scooby-Doo universe. She first stops Oberon from running at Granny Goodness, and later attends an event designed by Doctor Bedlam to kill Mister Miracle. Mister Miracle escapes the trap and Big Barda rescues Velma Dinkley and Daphne Blake. Barda then destroys the balcony that Stompa and the other New Gods were seated on, allowing enough time for the heroes to escape from Apokolips.

In other media

Television
 Stompa appears in Superman: The Animated Series, voiced by Diane Delano. Her first appearance was in the two-parter "Little Girl Lost", where she, along with Lashina and Mad Harriet, was summoned by Granny Goodness to battle Supergirl. Stompa was seen as the strongest of the Furies, though still no match for Superman. She also appeared later during the series finale "Legacy" where she and the others celebrated after Superman's success, and later attacked Superman when he betrayed them.
 Stompa also appeared in Justice League Unlimited episode "Alive". In the civil war between Granny Goodness and Virman Vundabar, Stompa, along with the rest of the Furies, fought on Granny's side until Darkseid returns and ends the conflict.
 Stompa appeared in the Batman: The Brave and the Bold episode "Duel of the Double Crossers!". She and her teammate Lashina served as members of Mongal's Furies. She briefly battled Batman, who defeated her with explosives.
 Stompa appears in DC Super Hero Girls, voiced by April Stewart. This version speaks in the third person and behaves similarly to Solomon Grundy.

Film
 Stompa appears in Superman/Batman: Apocalypse, voiced by Andrea Romano. She tries to squash Wonder Woman but is soon killed by Big Barda who stabs her through the back with a spear.
 Stompa appears in DC Super Hero Girls: Intergalactic Games, voiced by April Stewart. Alongside the other Female Furies, Stompa enters the Intergalactic Games with devious intentions, though the Furies were eventually defeated.

Video games
 Stompa appears in DC Universe Online.
 Stompa appears as a summonable character in Scribblenauts Unmasked: A DC Comics Adventure.
 Stompa appears as a playable character in Lego DC Super-Villains, voiced again by Diane Delano. She is unlocked by completing the mission "These Boots Were Made For Stompa", where the player battles and defeats Stompa, Lashina, and Mad Harriet. Stompa is depicted as the leader and most powerful of the Furies.

Books
 Stompa appears as the main antagonist in The Man of Steel: Superman and the Man of Gold by Paul Weissburg, published by Capstone as part of their DC Super Heroes line of illustrated children's books.
 Stompa appears alongside the Female Furies in The Dark Side of Apokolips by Laurie S. Sutton, also published by Capstone.

References

DC Comics aliens
DC Comics characters with superhuman strength
DC Comics deities
DC Comics demons
DC Comics female supervillains 
New Gods of Apokolips
Comics characters introduced in 1972
Characters created by Jack Kirby